Karepura is a village in Bangalore Rural district  in the state of Karnataka, India.

Demographics 
 India census, Karepura had a population of 540. Males constitute 49% of the population and females 51%.   

Karepua is about 26 km from Doddaballapur and around 60 km From Bangalore towards North East on Bangalore-Pune state highway (NH-7).  

Karepura receives scanty rainfall compared to other cachement areas in Karnataka. 

There is a temples in this village of Lord Hanuman. Every year Ramotsava is held in the village in the month of April where lot people of the village gather to offer prayers. Karepua has a Government school.

References 

Doddaballapura Taluk